Orest Romashyna (born October 27, 1946 in Rheine, Allied-occupied Germany) is a Canadian former ice hockey left winger of Ukrainian descent.

Romashyna was drafted 3rd overall by the Boston Bruins in the 1963 NHL Amateur Draft, but he neither played in the National Hockey League nor ever turned professional.

External links
Profile at hockeydraftcentral.com

1946 births
Living people
People from Rheine
Sportspeople from Münster (region)
Boston Bruins draft picks
Canadian ice hockey left wingers
National Hockey League first-round draft picks